Mihai Bălan (born 15 February 1954, Trebujeni) is a diplomat from Moldova . He was the ambassador of the Republic of Moldova to Israel in January–October 2012, and prior to this was ambassador of Moldova to Greece and Cyprus (2010 – 2011). Bălan was the Foreign Policy Advisor to the President of Moldova (December 15, 2009 - August 2010).

Biography
Mihai Bălan was born on 15 February 1954 in the village Trebujeni, Orhei district, Moldavian SSR of the Soviet Union. In 1972-1974, carried out the compulsory military service. In 1974-1979, he studied at the Moldova State University, Faculty of Philology (Romanian language and literature, Journalism specialty). 
From 1979 to 1980 he was the deputy chairperson of the Trade Union Committee of the Moldova State University, then, in 1980-1984 he was the chairperson of the trade union committee. In the same years (1980-1984), he was a lecturer at the journalism faculty of the Moldova State University in Chișinău.  Between 1984-1990 he was a councilor and head of division within the Party (in Chișinău).

From 1990 to 1994 he worked at the Ministry of Foreign Affairs of the Republic of Moldova: 
 1990-1992 - Head of the Division at the Financial and Administrative Directorate, 
 1992-1993 - Deputy Head of the Consular Department, 
 1993-1994 - Head of the Consular Department. 

In 1992, he held the diplomatic courses at the Ministry of Foreign Affairs of Romania, and in 1994 he held diplomatic courses at the Ministry of Foreign Affairs of Japan. From 1994 to 1995 he worked as a Business Advisor, at the Embassy of the Republic of Moldova in Israel, and from 1995 to 2001 he was Extraordinary and Plenipotentiary Ambassador of the Republic of Moldova in Israel.
In 2001 by 2005, Mihai Bălan returned to the Ministry of Foreign Affairs, being head of the Consular General Directorate. From January to May 2002, he studied at the George Marshal Center for Security Studies, Garmisch, Germany. Between 2006-2008, he worked in the private sector. From 2009 until 2010 he was the Counselor of the President of the Republic of Moldova Mihai Ghimpu on issues related to the foreign policy and European integration. 
In the period 2010 to 2011 he worked as Extraordinary and Plenipotentiary Ambassador of the Republic of Moldova at the Hellenic Republic and the Republic of Cyprus, Vlad Lupan replaced him as Foreign Policy Advisor to the President of Moldova. In January-October 2012 he served as Ambassador Extraordinary and Plenipotentiary of the Republic of Moldova in Israel. On 25 October 2012, by the Decision of the Parliament of the Republic of Moldova Nr. 224, with the vote of 60 MPs, was appointed as the Director of the Information and Security Service of the Republic of Moldova.

Personal life

Mihai Bălan is married to television star Ludmila Bălan, with whom he has two children: the singer Dan Bălan and television presenter Sanda Bălan. Besides the fact that his mother's native language is Romanian, Mihai Bălan also speaks English and Russian.

References

External links 
 Ludmila Bălan. Tanti Ludmila
 Vlad Lupan - noul consilier prezidențial pentru politică externă

Living people
Moldova State University alumni
Moldovan diplomats
Ambassadors of Moldova to Israel
Ambassadors of Moldova to Greece
Greece–Moldova relations
Recipients of the Order of Honour (Moldova)
1954 births